America's Sweethearts is a 2001 American romantic comedy film directed by Joe Roth and written by Billy Crystal and Peter Tolan. It stars Julia Roberts, Crystal, John Cusack and Catherine Zeta-Jones, with Hank Azaria, Stanley Tucci, Seth Green, Alan Arkin and Christopher Walken in smaller roles.

Plot
Film publicist Lee Phillips (Billy Crystal) is promoting Time Over Time, a movie featuring beloved husband-and-wife stars Gwen Harrison (Catherine Zeta-Jones) and Eddie Thomas (John Cusack), who have made countless popular films together. However, the eccentric director Hal Weidman (Christopher Walken) won't let anyone see the film until its premiere at a press junket, complicating Lee's job. And worse yet: Gwen and Eddie, once dubbed “America's Sweethearts”, have an ugly breakup. 

Gwen's films without Eddie have been flops. On the Larry King Live show, she is thoroughly humiliated by Larry King causing her to apologize live. Her affair with co-star Hector Gorgonzolas (Hank Azaria), who now lives with her, caused Eddie to suffer a mental breakdown and he moves to a New Age retreat. Lee decides the press must believe the couple are reuniting to promote the film. Lee enlists Kathleen Harrison, nicknamed “Kiki” (Julia Roberts), who is Gwen's sister and personal assistant, to persuade Gwen that attending the junket will benefit her career and public image, where she can also serve Eddie divorce papers. At the New Age retreat, Lee informs Eddie of Gwen's humiliation on Larry King. He believes this is her karma for her affair with Hector and refuses to attend the junket. Eddie believes he's not well enough to face his past yet. Lee bribes his spiritual guide (Alan Arkin) with a luxury car to persuade him to attend.

At the junket, while Eddie and Gwen are fighting, Lee plants stories to the press they are reconciling. Gwen asks Kiki to be her go-between with Eddie, so they meet secretly to discuss the junket. Eddie's assistant leaks a photo of it to the press. Angered by the rumors about Gwen and Eddie, Hector shows up, confronts Eddie and knocks him out. As Kiki tends to Eddie, they admit their feelings and have sex. However, in the morning, as they are having breakfast, Gwen calls and Eddie rushes to meet with her. Hurt and angered, Kiki leaves, later becoming furious when Eddie tells Gwen he isn't seeing anyone. Confronting him, she says they can't pursue a relationship because he'll never get over Gwen. Downstairs, Lee tells Kiki not to give up on Eddie as he can see he has feelings for her.

Eddie has an epiphany while on the hotel roof, causing the press to believe that he's about to jump, and inciting Hector and the studio's owner Dave Kingman (Stanley Tucci) to encourage him in doing so. Gwen is thoroughly humiliated, warning him to stop as she wants maintain to the press that she and Eddie are reconciling. Hector tells her to stop bothering, pointing out that there's no need to hide their relationship. Gwen argues that they need to exercise caution because it's bad enough that her reputation is on the line. She's concerned that the press will find out she and Hector are the direct cause of Eddie's mental breakdown. Eddie tells Lee he's in love with Kiki and thinks he's blown it. Lee realizes his mistake, telling Eddie to pursue Kiki and divorce Gwen. Weidman then shows up via helicopter with the film.

The screening begins, and everyone discovers that Weidman abandoned the script, making a “reality movie” instead. The footage, mostly shot with hidden cameras and without the actors' knowledge, shows Gwen's unremorseful affair with Hector, gloating about it to then overweight and timid Kiki. Eddie becomes angry about Gwen's clear infidelity, but he otherwise appears sympathetic. He is shown to actually be in love with Kiki even before her weight loss and realized how much his marriage to Gwen is a mistake. Additionally, Dave Kingman is insulted by Weidman and mocked by his assistant. Hector enjoys the reality film very much, until Gwen insults him about the size of his penis. On the other hand, the film portrays Eddie and Kiki favorably, while Gwen is the antagonist due to her affair with Hector.

As a result, most of the cast and crew — particularly Gwen and Kingman — are offended and confront Weidman. Eddie appears pleased by the film's portrayal of what she did to him. He suggests working together again and Weidman agrees seeing that he understands the latter's vision. He reveals it was all his plan to ruin Gwen's career because of an earlier incident on set for insulting his vision and humiliate Kingman for being a selfish jerk for having not allowed him any creative control over his film. Enraged, she announces she will sue him for invasion of privacy and Kingman Studios for having not prevented it. Kingman tries to apologize to Gwen, but his assistant tells him off not to after what she did to Eddie and that he quits. Kiki is surprised, but not angered by the portrayal of her sister and also pleased to be shown favorably. Hector angrily confronts Gwen for humiliating him with her comments, despite Lee's attempts to do damage control and asking him to go back sitting down. Weidman's daughter, Leaf (Keri Lynn Pratt), defends both her father's work and him. She reveals their affair, pointing out Gwen's wrong to say Hector's small.

Humiliated, Gwen announces she is reconciling with Eddie, but he asserts he's finally through with her, and declares his love for Kiki. The latter reciprocates, standing up to Gwen for the first time, and revealing dirty secrets only she knew. She tells Gwen that she is tired of putting her personal life on hold to clean up the latter's mess each time she's in trouble with the press and wants her to take accountability for herself. Gwen retaliates by coldly firing her, before calming down and declaring she only wants Kiki's happiness, to look better to the press.

Outside, Gwen admits to the press that she and Eddie are over and is in love with Hector. She then claims she's on medication that makes her behave erratically and adds that he is very well-endowed. However, the press doesn't believe Gwen, having witnessed their relationship is disintegrating and how horrible of a sister she was to Kiki. Hector defends himself to the press, then humiliates her by announcing they too are through and had an affair with another co-star of theirs, Adina.

Kiki and Eddie prepare to leave together to travel and pursue their relationship. Lee arrives to tell them that, amazingly, the press love the movie and Kingman Studios have to release it despite Gwen's lawsuit threat.

Cast

 Julia Roberts as Kathleen "Kiki" Harrison
 Billy Crystal as Lee Phillips
 Catherine Zeta-Jones as Gwen Harrison
 John Cusack as Eddie Thomas
 Hank Azaria as Hector Gorgonzolas
 Stanley Tucci as Dave Kingman
 Christopher Walken as Hal Weidman
 Alan Arkin as Wellness guide
 Seth Green as Danny Wax
 Scot Zeller as Davis
 Larry King as himself
 Steve Pink as Limo driver
 Rainn Wilson as Dave O'Hanlon
 Eric Balfour as Security guard
 Marty Belafsky as Security guard
 Keri Lynn Pratt as Leaf Weidman
 Maria Canals as Adina
 Byron Allen as himself

Julia Roberts' niece, Emma Roberts, makes an uncredited appearance as the young girl in the purple T-shirt.

Release

Box office
America's Sweethearts opened on July 20, 2001, and earned $30,181,877 in its opening weekend, ranking second behind Jurassic Park III ($50,771,645). By the end of its run, the film had grossed $93,607,673 in the domestic box office and $44,583,755 overseas for a worldwide total of $138,191,428. Based on a $46 million budget, the film was a box office success. Filming took place at Lake Las Vegas.

Critical response
Despite being a box office success, the film holds a 32% approval rating at Rotten Tomatoes from 146 critics. The site's consensus states: "Despite its famous cast, the movie lacks sympathetic characters and is only funny in spurts." On Metacritic, the film holds a 44 out of 100 rating based on 32 reviews, indicating "mixed or average reviews". Audiences polled by CinemaScore gave the film an average grade of "B" on an A+ to F scale. Gustavo Arellano in his writing ¡Ask a Mexican! identified Azaria's character Hector as an example of the Latin lover stereotype.

References

External links
 
 
 
 

2001 films
2000s English-language films
2001 romantic comedy films
American romantic comedy films
American sex comedy films
Adultery in films
Films scored by James Newton Howard
Films about actors
Films directed by Joe Roth
Films set in California
Films set in the Las Vegas Valley
Films set in Los Angeles
Films set in Nevada
Films shot in California
Films shot in the Las Vegas Valley
Films shot in Los Angeles
Films shot in Nevada
Films with screenplays by Billy Crystal
Films with screenplays by Peter Tolan
Revolution Studios films
Columbia Pictures films
2000s American films